Celebrity Karaoke Club is a British reality television singing show in which celebrities sing karaoke in hope of being crowned champion. It began on 23 September 2020 on ITV2.

The first series was won by Scarlett Moffatt. The show was renewed for a second series and a special edition featuring drag queens and kings in 2021, and the show began airing nightly instead of weekly. The second series began on 5 July 2021 and was won by AJ Odudu, whilst the Drag edition was won by Trinity The Tuck. The show was renewed for a third series which began airing on 6 June 2022, after the premiere of Love Island and was won by Kaz Kamwi.

Format
A group of celebrities are brought together in a karaoke bar in London. Seven celebrities enter on the first night. They first compete in a solo round where they select a song from the playlist which has a different theme each week. Following this, they sing a duet with another celebrity. When there is an odd number of celebrities left in the club, a special guest usually accompanies the celebrity on stage to duet one of their own songs. At the end of the evening each celebrity votes for who they think was the best and worst performer, the two worst performers compete in a Karaoke Clash and the remaining celebrities choose who is eliminated. The following week, the eliminated celebrity is replaced by one or more new celebrities who are also eligible to be crowned karaoke champion.

Series overview

Series 1 (2020)

Results and elimination

 Keywords
 SAFE = The celebrity advanced to the following week
 ELIM = The celebrity was eliminated.
 BTM2 = The celebrity was in the bottom two but was saved by their fellow celebrities
 RUNNER-UP = The celebrity was the runner-up.
 WINNER = The celebrity was the winner.
 Stayed = The celebrity was eliminated but remained in the club for the rest of the night.

 Colour key
 The celebrity was eliminated.
 The celebrity was voted the best performance.
 The celebrity was in the bottom two but was saved by their fellow celebrities
 The celebrity was the runner-up.
 The celebrity was the winner.

Episodes

Week 1
Opening number: "Shut Up and Dance"
Solo Round: Squad Goals
Closing number: "Bye, Bye, Baby (Baby Goodbye)"

Karaoke Clash;

Votes to eliminate
Scarlett: Tallia
Courtney: Tallia
Luke: David
Melvin: David
Jess: Tallia

Week 2
Opening number: "Wake Me Up Before You Go-Go"
Solo Round: Slide into the DMs
Closing number: "Goodbye"

Karaoke Clash;

Votes to eliminate
Luke: Jess
Courtney: Melvin
Judi: Jess
David: Melvin
Scarlett: Melvin

Week 3
Opening number: "I Predict a Riot"
Solo Round: Lyrically Blessed
Closing number: "Bye Bye Bye"

Karaoke Clash;

Votes to eliminate
Scarlett: Judi
Courtney: Luke
Diana: Luke
Jess: Judi
David: Judi

Week 4
Opening number: "Best Song Ever"
Solo Round: Teenage Dirtbag
Closing number: "Leaving on a Jet Plane"

Karaoke Clash;

Votes to eliminate
 David: Courtney 
 Jess: Diana
 Scarlett: Diana
 Baga: Diana
 Luke: Voting intention not revealed

Week 5
Opening number: "I Bet You Look Good on the Dancefloor"
Solo Round: Sing as Your Mum Would Fancy
Closing number: "Don't You (Forget About Me)"

Karaoke Clash;

Votes to Eliminate
Luke: Baga & Samira
Courtney: Baga & David
Jess: Baga & Samira
Luke: Baga & Samira
Scarlett: Baga & Samira

Week 6: Final
Opening number: "Good as Hell"
Closing number: "Raise Your Glass"

Karaoke Clash;

Series 2 (2021)

Results and elimination

 Keywords
 SAFE = The celebrity advanced to the following week
 ELIM = The celebrity was eliminated.
 BTM2 = The celebrity was in the bottom two but was saved by their fellow celebrities
 RUNNER-UP = The celebrity was the runner-up.
 WINNER = The celebrity was the winner.
 Stayed = The celebrity was eliminated but remained in the club for the rest of the night.

 Colour key
 The celebrity was eliminated.
 The celebrity was voted the best performance.
 The celebrity was in the bottom two but was saved by their fellow celebrities
 The celebrity was the runner-up.
 The celebrity was the winner.

Episodes

Day 1
Opening number: "Can't Stop the Feeling!"
Solo Round: In with a Bang
Duet Round: Shower Serenades
Closing number: "When You're Gone"

Karaoke Clash;

Votes to eliminate
AJ: Max & Harvey
Amelia: Max & Harvey
Tanya: Max & Harvey
Brian: Voting intention not revealed
Olivia: Voting intention not revealed

Day 2
Opening number: "Black Magic"
Solo Round: Feeling Sexy
Duet Round: Vegas Heavy Hitters
Closing number: "Don't Leave Me This Way"

Karaoke Clash;

Votes to eliminate
Tanya: Amelia
AJ: Sonny
Mark-Francis: Olivia
Brian: Sonny

Day 3
Opening number: "What Makes You Beautiful"
Solo Round: Teenage Fantasy
Duet Round: Everybody Dance
Closing number: "Survivor"

Karaoke Clash;

Votes to eliminate
Tanya: Marcel
Olivia: Mark-Francis
Brian: Marcel
AJ: Marcel
Amelia: Voting intention not revealed
Suzi: Voting intention not revealed

Day 4
Opening number: "I Kissed a Girl"
Solo Round: Feeling Myself
Duet Round: A Night at the Movies
Closing number: "Stay Another Day"

Karaoke Clash;

Votes to eliminate
Mark-Francis: Darren & Olivia
Brian: Darren & Amelia
Suzi: Amelia & Olivia
AJ: Amelia & Olivia
Tanya: Darren & Olivia

Since there was a tie between Darren and Amelia, Karaoke Champion Tanya had the deciding vote.

Day 5
Opening number: "Uptown Funk"
Solo Round: Last Orders
Duet Round: Flashback Friday
Closing number: "Since U Been Gone"

Karaoke Clash;

Votes to eliminate
Brian: Suzi
Jordan: Suzi
Yasmin: Tanya
Amelia: Suzi
AJ: Suzi
Mark-Francis: Voting intention not revealed

Day 6: Final
Opening number: "Spice Up Your Life"
Solo Round: All Time Anthems
Duet Round: On the Edge of Glory
Closing number: "Never Forget"

Karaoke Clash;

Drag Edition (2021)

Results and elimination

 Keywords
 SAFE = The drag queen/king advanced to the following week
 ELIM = The drag queen/king was eliminated.
 BTM2 = The drag queen/king was in the bottom two but was saved by their fellow celebrities
 RUNNER-UP = The drag queen/king was the runner-up.
 WINNER = The drag queen/king was the winner.
 WD = The drag queen/king withdrew from the competition.
 Stayed = The drag queen/king was eliminated but remained in the club for the rest of the night.

 Colour key
 The drag queen/king was eliminated.
 The drag queen/king was voted the best performance.
 The drag queen/king was in the bottom two but was saved by their fellow celebrities
 The drag queen/king withdrew from the competition.
 The drag queen/king was the runner-up.
 The drag queen/king was the winner.

Episodes

Day 1
Opening number: "Stupid Love"
Solo Round: Gay
Duet Round: Body-ody-ody
Closing number: "I Will Always Love You"

Karaoke Clash;

Votes to eliminate
Trinity The Tuck: Freida Slaves
Cara Melle: Freida Slaves
Tete Bang: Crystal
The Vivienne: Freida Slaves
Manila Luzon: Voting intention not revealed

Day 2
Opening number: "Timber"
Solo Round: Basic Bottomless Brunch
Duet Round: Butch Queen
Closing number: "How Do I Live"

Karaoke Clash;

Votes to eliminate
The Vivienne: Crystal
Trinity The Tuck: Crystal
Tete Bang: Cara Melle
Manila Luzon: Crystal
Gingzilla: Crystal

Day 3
Opening number: "Crazy in Love"
Solo Round: Lights, Camera, Action
Duet Round: Sisters Are Doin' It for Themselves
Closing number: "Leave (Get Out)"

Karaoke Clash;

Votes to eliminate
Gingzilla: Vinegar Strokes
Trinity The Tuck: Vinegar Strokes
Manila Luzon: Tete Bang
Cara Melle: Vinegar Strokes
The Vivienne: Voting intention not revealed

Day 4
Opening number: "Who Do You Think You Are"
Solo Round: Salty Songs
Duet Round: Huns Only
Closing number: "We Are Never Ever Getting Back Together"

Karaoke Clash;

Votes to eliminate
Manila Luzon: Tete Bang
Cara Melle: Tete Bang
Lil' Test Ease: Gingzilla
The Vivienne: Tete Bang
Trinity The Tuck: Voting intention not revealed

Day 5
Opening number: "Call Me Maybe"
Solo Round: Money Talks
Duet Round: Stars and Stripes
Closing number: "Sorry Not Sorry"
Cara Melle withdrew from the competition due to illness.

Karaoke Clash;

Votes to eliminate
Lil' Test Ease: Mahatma Khandi
Manila Luzon: Mahatma Khandi
Trinity The Tuck: Mahatma Khandi
Danny Beard: Voting intention not revealed
The Vivienne: Voting intention not revealed

Day 6: Final
Opening number: "Believe"
Solo Round: Killer Karaoke
Duet Round: 2 Gays 1 Bop
Closing number: "I Wanna Dance with Somebody (Who Loves Me)"

Karaoke Clash;

Series 3 (2022)
{| class="wikitable" style="margin: auto; text-align: center"
|-
! Celebrity
! Known for
! Entered
! Status
|-
| Callum Izzard
| Ibiza Weekender star
| Day 1
| style="background:#f4c7b8"|Eliminated 1ston 6 June 2022
|-
| Matt Evers
| Dancing on Ice professional
| Day 2
| style="background:#f4c7b8"|Eliminated 2ndon 7 June 2022
|-
| Karim Zeroual
| Former CBBC presenter
| Day 1
| style="background:#f4c7b8"|Eliminated 3rdon 8 June 2022
|-
| A'Whora
| Drag queen & RuPaul's Drag Race UK contestant 
| Day 1
| style="background:#f4c7b8"|Eliminated 4thon 9 June 2022
|-
| Chrishell Stause
| Actress & Selling Sunset star
| Day 1
| style="background:#f4c7b8"|Eliminated 5thon 10 June 2022
|-style="height:50px"
| Arron Crascall
| Internet personality & comedian
| Day 5
| rowspan="3" style="background:#f4c7b8"|Eliminated 6th, 7th & 8thon 11 June 2022
|-style="height:50px"
| Chloe Sims
| The Only Way Is Essex star
| Day 4
|-style="height:50px"
| Laura Anderson
| Love Island finalist
| Day 1
|-style="height:50px"
| Queen MoJo
| Dancer & Peckham's Finest star
| Day 5
| rowspan="2" style="background:#f4c7b8"|Eliminated 9th & 10thon 11 June 2022
|-style="height:50px"
| Bobby Cole Norris
| Former The Only Way Is Essex star
| Day 1
|-
| Donna Preston
| Actress, comedian & writer 
| Day 1
| style="background:silver"|Runner-upon 11 June 2022|-
| style="background:lavender"|Kaz Kamwi| style="background:lavender"|Love Island finalist| style="background:lavender"|Day 3| style="background:gold"|Winneron 11 June 2022'|-
|}

Results and elimination

 Keywords
 SAFE = The celebrity advanced to the following week
 ELIM = The celebrity was eliminated.
 BTM2 = The celebrity was in the bottom two but was saved by their fellow celebrities
 RUNNER-UP = The celebrity was the runner-up.
 WINNER = The celebrity was the winner.
 Stayed = The celebrity was eliminated but remained in the club for the rest of the night.

 Colour key
 The celebrity was eliminated.
 The celebrity was voted the best performance.
 The celebrity was in the bottom two but was saved by their fellow celebrities
 The celebrity was the runner-up.
 The celebrity was the winner.

Episodes
Day 1
Opening number: "We Found Love"
Closing number: "Sorry"

Karaoke Clash;

Votes to eliminate
A'Whora: Callum
Karim: Callum
Chrishell: Callum
Donna: Voting intention not revealedLaura: Voting intention not revealedDay 2
Opening number: "Domino"
Closing number: "I Knew You Were Trouble"

Karaoke Clash;

Votes to eliminate
Donna: Matt
Karim: A'Whora
Chrishell: Matt
Laura: Matt
Bobby: Voting intention not revealedDay 3
Opening number: "Just Dance" 
Closing number: "Tears Dry on Their Own"
Fleur East appeared as a special guest.

Karaoke Clash;

Votes to eliminate
Fleur East: Karim
Laura: A'Whora
Kaz: Karim
Bobby: Karim
Chrishell: Karim
Donna: Voting intention not revealedDay 4
Opening number: "Raise Your Glass"
Closing number: "I'll Be There for You"
Antony Costa and Simon Webbe appeared as special guests.

Karaoke Clash;

Votes to eliminate
Chloe: A'Whora
Donna: Laura
Bobby: A'Whora
Chrishell: Laura
Kaz: A'Whora

Day 5
Opening number: "Hot n Cold"
Closing number: "Back for Good"

Karaoke Clash;

Votes to eliminate
Arron: Chrishell
Donna: Laura
Chloe: Chrishell
Bobby: Laura
Kaz: Chrishell
Queen MoJo: Voting intention not revealed''

Day 6
Opening number: "I Gotta Feeling"
Closing number: "Remember"

Karaoke Clash;

References

External links 
 
 

2020 British television series debuts
2020s British music television series
2020s British reality television series
ITV reality television shows
English-language television shows